The Pesse canoe is believed to be the world's oldest-known boat and certainly the oldest-known canoe. Carbon dating indicates that the boat was constructed during the early mesolithic period between 8040 BC and 7510 BC. It is now in the Drents Museum in Assen, Netherlands.

Description
It was formed from a single Scots pine log. Marks are present in the cavity, likely formed from flint or antler tools. 

It was a suitable vehicle for inhabitants who spent much of their time hunting and fishing in a watery landscape of marshes, creeks and lakes. This is confirmed by another discovery in the region of the great rivers Maas, Rhine and Waal: graves, dating back to between 5500 and 5000 BC. Judging by the food remains near the grave, the group lived on the safe heights of river dunes while using their canoes to catch pike in the river, in addition to using flint arrows to shoot birds while gathering fruits, vegetables and nuts.

History

The boat was discovered in 1955 during the construction of the Dutch A28 motorway. The route passes south of the village of Pesse in Hoogeveen through what was a peat bog. Local farmer Hendrik Wanders noticed the log and took it for further inspection. He gave the boat to the University of Groningen, where it was examined and freeze dried for preservation. It was later transferred to the Drents Museum, located near the discovery site.

Debate
A visiting Danish archeologist questioned whether such a small boat would be seaworthy. In 2001, an exact replica was constructed by archaeologist Jaap Beuker and successfully paddled by a canoeist, proving that it did in fact function as a boat. 

Some also theorized that the find could have been another object, like an animal feeder. Beuker noted that animals were not kept by the people from the boat's era (in fact, no domesticated farm or work animals were kept anywhere in Europe yet during the Mesolithic), so it could not have been a trough. The boat is also similar in construction to prehistoric canoes found in other countries.

References

9th-millennium BC works
8th-millennium BC works
Archaeological discoveries in the Netherlands
Canoes
Hoogeveen
1955 archaeological discoveries